The Seminole Soccer Complex is the on-campus soccer stadium at Florida State University in Tallahassee, Florida.

The 2,000-seat stadium was built in 1998. The current tenants are the Florida State Seminoles women's soccer team, who are 170-37-14 at home

Championships
The women's soccer team won the 2014 National Championship with a 1–0 win over the University of Virginia and the 2018 National Championship with 1–0 win over the University of North Carolina.

See also
Florida State Seminoles
Florida State Seminoles women's soccer
History of Florida State University
List of Florida State University professional athletes

External links
 Seminoles.com – Official website of the Florida State Seminoles women's soccer team.
 Seminole Soccer Complex website

Sports venues completed in 1998
Soccer venues in Florida
Florida State University
Sports venues in Tallahassee, Florida
College soccer venues in the United States
1998 establishments in Florida